Three Rivers School District may refer to:

 Three Rivers Community Schools, a school district in Michigan, USA
 Three Rivers Independent School District, a school district in Texas, USA
 Three Rivers School District (Oregon), USA; a school district

Other uses
 Three Rivers Conference (disambiguation), school sports districts
 Three Rivers District (VHSL), Virginia, USA; a school sports district

See also
 Three Rivers (disambiguation)